Astaneh Rural District may refer to:
 Astaneh Rural District (Markazi Province)
 Astaneh Rural District (Razavi Khorasan Province)